188 (one hundred [and] eighty-eight) is the natural number following 187 and preceding 189.

In mathematics
There are 188 different four-element semigroups, and 188 ways a chess queen can move from one corner of a  board to the opposite corner by a path that always moves closer to its goal. The sides and diagonals of a regular dodecagon form 188 equilateral triangles.

In other fields
The number 188 figures prominently in the film The Parallel Street (1962) by German experimental film director . The opening frame of the film is just an image of this number.

See also
 The year AD 188 or 188 BC
 List of highways numbered 188

References

Integers